{{Speciesbox
|name = Shiny bog-rush
|image = Schoenus nitens BG Dresden.jpg
|image_caption = 
|genus = Schoenus
|species = nitens
|authority = (R.Br.) Roem. & Schult.
|synonyms_ref =
|synonyms =
 <small>Schoenus nitens var. major Ewart & Jean White</small>
 Schoenus nitens var. concinnus (Hook.f.) Cheeseman 
}}Schoenus nitens, known as the shiny bog-rush, is a species of sedge native to Australia. A small perennial grass-like plant growing from 15 to 35 cm tall. The stem is cylindrical, 0.5 to 1 mm wide. Often seen in seasonally moist habitats, near beaches or brackish water near the coast. Occasionally seen inland in swampy, wet areas near lakes.The specific epithet nitens'' is derived from Latin, meaning shiny".

References 

nitens
Plants described in 1810
Flora of New South Wales
Flora of Victoria (Australia)
Flora of Queensland
Flora of Tasmania
Flora of Western Australia
Flora of South Australia